The 2013 Louisiana–Lafayette Ragin' Cajuns football program represented the University of Louisiana at Lafayette as a member of the Sun Belt Conference during in the 2013 NCAA Division I FBS football season. They were led by third-year head coach Mark Hudspeth and played their home games at Cajun Field. They finished the season 9–4 overall and 5–2 in Sun Belt play to claim a share of the conference title with Arkansas State. Louisiana–Lafayette was invited to the New Orleans Bowl for the third consecutive year, where they defeated Tulane. However, in 2015 Louisiana–Lafayette vacated eight wins including their New Orleans Bowl victory and Sun Belt Conference co-championship due to alleged major NCAA violations.

Preseason

Award watchlists

Sun Belt Media Day

Predicted standings

Preseason All–Conference Team

Offensive
OL Andre Huval

Defense
DL Christian Ringo
LB Justin Anderson
DB Isaiah Newsome

Roster

Schedule

 Source: Schedule

Game summaries

@ Arkansas

@ Kansas State

Nicholls State

@ Akron

Texas State

@ Western Kentucky

@ Arkansas State

New Mexico State

Troy

@ Georgia State

Louisiana–Monroe

@ South Alabama

Tulane (New Orleans Bowl)

Post-Season

All-Sun Belt/American Teams

Offensive
RB Alonzo Harris, JR (First Team)
RB Elijah McGuire, FR (First Team)
OL Andre Huval, SR (First Team)
WR Jamal Robinson, JR (Second Team)
OL Daniel Quave, JR (Second Team)

Defense
LB Justin Alexander, SR (First Team)
DL Justin Hamilton, JR (Second Team)
DB Trevence Patt, JR (Second Team)

Specialists
RS Darryl Surgent, SR (First Team)

Honorable Mentions
TE Jacob Maxwell, SR
DE Dominique Tovell, SO

References

Louisiana-Lafayette
Louisiana Ragin' Cajuns football seasons
Sun Belt Conference football champion seasons
New Orleans Bowl champion seasons
Louisiana-Lafayette Ragin' Cajuns football